Super League XXVI was the 2021 season of Super League, and 126th season of rugby league in Great Britain. The season started on 26 March 2021, with all six fixtures taking place behind closed doors, at Headingley. It was originally scheduled to have consisted of 27 regular season games, but changes introduced during the season shortened the competition to 25 rounds and subsequent play-offs. The season finale, the Grand Final, took place at Old Trafford, on 9 October 2021.

Due to the ongoing effects of the Covid-19 pandemic, the Magic Weekend, which was cancelled in 2020, took place over the weekend of 4–5 September 2021 at St James' Park, Newcastle.

The full fixture list was released on 26 February 2021, with defending champions St Helens, starting their title defence against Last Year's Challenge Cup finalists Salford Red Devils (a repeat of the 2019 Super League Grand Final), whilst last season's runners up, Wigan Warriors played newly promoted Leigh Centurions.

Regular season

Round 1

Round 2 (Mose Masoe Round)

Round 3

Round 4

Round 5

Round 6

Round 7

Round 8

Round 9 (Rainbow Laces round)
The matches in round 9 were played while giving support to the Rainbow Laces campaign run by Stonewall.

Round 10

Round 11

Round 12

Round 13

Round 14

Round 15

Round 16

Round 17

Round 18

Round 19

Round 20 (Rivals Round)

Round 21

Round 22

Round 23 (Magic Weekend)

Round 24

Round 25

Play-offs

Team bracket

Week 1: Eliminators

Week 2: Semi-finals

Week 3: Grand Final

References

Super League XXVI